Mecyclothorax lackneri is a species of ground beetle in the subfamily Psydrinae. It was described by Baehr in 2008.

References

lackneri
Beetles described in 2008